Rudolf Hasse (30 May 1906 – 12 August 1942) was a German racing driver who won the 1937 Belgian Grand Prix.

Hasse was born in Mittweida, Saxony, and died while serving on the Russian front during World War II in a military hospital in Makiivka, Ukraine, from shigellosis aged only 36. In the 1930s he was a member of the National Socialist Motor Corps.

References

1906 births
1942 deaths
People from Mittweida
People from the Kingdom of Saxony
German racing drivers
Grand Prix drivers
Racing drivers from Saxony
National Socialist Motor Corps members
Deaths from dysentery
Place of death missing
European Championship drivers
German military personnel killed in World War II